Linia  (formerly ) is a village in Wejherowo County, Pomeranian Voivodeship, in northern Poland. It is the seat of the gmina (administrative district) called Gmina Linia. Kashubian is spoken in the village as a secondary language.

For details of the history of the region, see History of Pomerania. Every year, the local Communal Cultural Centre organise the  Kashubian Embroidery Competition in the village.

The village has a population of 1,405.

References

Linia